Edward Matthew Horsington (2 May 1878 – 23 July 1947) was an Australian politician.

Biography 
He was born at Lower Alma, Timor, Victoria, to Julia, née Farrell, of Portarlington, Ireland, and farmer John Waygood Horsington, of Somerset, England.

John Waygood Horsington, his two sisters and their mother had survived the 1852 Ticonderoga fever-ship disaster, but John's father had been amongst the 100 who had been buried at sea, before the onshore makeshift quarantine ordeal when another 80 died.

In Victoria, John had tried shoemaking in Brunswick, in partnership with his brother James, gold mining in the Maryborough area, and whilst farming at Lower Alma, floated a gold-mining company, the Horsington Freehold Claim, which was financially unsuccessful.

Edward, known as "Ted", was John's eighth child, and Julia's fourth. While various references, including Who's Who in Australia 1947, state that Edward was educated in Maryborough, it is much more likely that he attended one of the rural schools which offered classes up to eighth grade, much closer to his home at Lower Alma, in the Maryborough district.

Horsington’s entry in the 1947 “Who’s Who in Australia” recorded that his recreation was gardening.

Career 
He became a drover and miner after leaving school and worked in Queensland, New South Wales and Western Australia before settling in Broken Hill. On 31 December 1906 he married Rosalie Bryksky, with whom he had two daughters, one who died aged 10 years, the other being widowed after five years of marriage and later re-marrying.

From 1912 to 1922, Horsington was secretary of the Broken Hill branch of the Federated Engine Drivers and Firemen's Union. He also served as director of Broken Hill Hospital  and as a Broken Hill City Alderman.

Political career 
In 1922, Horsington was elected to the New South Wales Legislative Assembly as one of the Labor members for Sturt. He continued as member for Sturt after the return of single-member divisions in 1927, and briefly served as Secretary for Lands and Minister for Forests from May to October 1927. He was expelled from the Labor Party in 1936 but readmitted later that year, and in June 1939 joined Bob Heffron's Industrial Labor Party. The ILP was reintegrated into the official Labor Party in August of that year, and Horsington continued to represent Sturt until he retired in 1947.

Horsington is well-represented in newspapers now online in the National Library of Australia's TROVE at www.trove.nla,gov.au. During the debate to proceed with amending the Bill for Compensation for diseased Broken Hill miners, Horsington directed language towards the Premier which was "worthy of censure" and was removed from the Chamber.

Death and legacy 
He died at Waverley in Sydney on 23 July of that year. A large number of New South Wales newspapers reported his passing.

On 24 July 1947, the Barrier Miner, a Broken Hill newspaper, published:

A much more detailed obituary appeared in the Barrier Daily Truth (Broken Hill), Thursday 24 July 1947, page 3.

Edward Matthew Horsington's remains were buried in the South Head Cemetery, Vaucluse, Waverley Council, New South Wales, joining those of his wife, Rosalie, who had died nearly a year before him.

In September 1951, a section of the Silverton Highway on the outskirts of Broken Hill, was named Horsington Drive, to commemorate his work, and 180 trees donated by industry were planted as an avenue. Whilst the trees appear not to have survived, the stone cairn related to the naming and planting remains in situ.

References

1878 births
1947 deaths
Members of the New South Wales Legislative Assembly
Australian Labor Party members of the Parliament of New South Wales